Gants is a surname. Notable people with the surname include:

India Gants (born 1996), American fashion model
Ralph Gants (1954–2020), American attorney and jurist

See also
Gant (surname)
The Gants
Gantt (surname)